The basic statistical unit is a type of statistical unit used by Statistics Norway to provide stable and coherent geographical units for regional statistics in Norway. Basic statistical units are subdivisions of municipalities (they never include land in more than one municipality), and cover generally homogeneous areas. Most basic statistical units include a few hundred inhabitants, but as their borders are near constant, this can vary widely over time.

References
 

Demographics of Norway
Subdivisions of Norway